The 1990 Camel GT Championship season was the 20th season of the IMSA GT Championship auto racing series.  It consisted of GTP and Lights classes of prototypes, as well as Grand Tourer-style racing cars which ran in the GTO and GTU classes, as well as a tube-frame All-American Challenge (AAC) class during select GT-only rounds.  It began February 3, 1990, and ended November 11, 1990, after twenty rounds.

Schedule
The GT and Prototype classes did not participate in all events, nor did they race together at shorter events.  The AAC class only participated in GT-only events.  Races marked with All had all classes on track at the same time.

Season results

Drivers Championships

Geoff Brabham won the GTP Drivers Championship driving a Nissan GTP ZX-T and a Nissan NPT-90.

Manufacturers championships
A championship for manufacturers was awarded to each of the four classes.  For the prototype classes, only the manufacturer of the engine was used rather than the manufacturer of the chassis.

Points were awarded to the top 10 on the scale of 20-15-12-10-8-6-4-3-2-1, with exception for the 12 Hours of Sebring, which added five points to each position on the scale, and the 24 Hours of Daytona, which added eight points.

Only the highest-ranking entry from a manufacturer was awarded points at each event.  Any other finishes by that manufacturer were merely skipped.

GTP Championship

Lights Championship

GTO Championship

GTU Championship

External links
 World Sports Racing Prototypes - 1990 IMSA GT Championship results

IMSA GT Championship seasons
IMSA GT Championship